Andrej Hauptman (born 5 May 1975) is a Slovenian former professional road racing cyclist. In 2001 he became the first Slovenian rider to take a world championship medal in cycling when he won the bronze in the road race at the Road World Championships. After retiring from competition, he became a cycling coach: he is coach of fellow Slovenian cyclist Tadej Pogačar and also serves as head coach and head of selectors for the Slovenian national cycling team. He formerly managed , where as well as guiding Pogačar through his under-23 career he coached Primož Roglič when the latter switched from ski jumping to cycling and rode for the team's development squad. In May 2019 Hauptman joined  as a directeur sportif after Pogačar joined the team.

Major results

1997
5th Road race, UCI Under-23 Road World Championships
1998
1st  Overall Okolo Slovenska
1st Stage 6
Tour de Slovénie
1st Stages 2 & 7
1st Stage 1 Tour of Austria
1999
8th Grand Prix Pino Cerami
2000
1st  Road race, National Road Championships
1st Grand Prix de Fourmies
3rd Ronde van Midden-Zeeland
9th Classic Haribo
2001
1st  Overall Istrian Spring Trophy
1st Stage 3
3rd  Road race, UCI Road World Championships
5th HEW Cyclassics
5th Paris–Tours
7th E3 Prijs Vlaanderen
2002
4th Road race, UCI Road World Championships
4th Grand Prix of Aargau Canton
9th Grand Prix Pino Cerami
2004
5th Road race, Olympic Games
9th HEW Cyclassics
10th Grand Prix Pino Cerami

References

External links 
 

Slovenian male cyclists
Living people
1975 births
Olympic cyclists of Slovenia
Cyclists at the 2000 Summer Olympics
Cyclists at the 2004 Summer Olympics
Sportspeople from Ljubljana
Slovenian cycling coaches